Reginald Lee Germany (born March 19, 1978) is a former American football wide receiver in the National Football League. He was drafted by the Buffalo Bills in the seventh round of the 2001 NFL Draft. He played college football for the Ohio State Buckeyes.

References

External links

1978 births
Living people
American football wide receivers
Buffalo Bills players
Ohio State Buckeyes football players
People from St. Louis County, Missouri
Players of American football from Missouri